Nicolas Haas (born 23 January 1996) is a Swiss professional footballer who plays as a midfielder for Serie A club Empoli.

Club career
Haas is a youth exponent from FC Luzern. He made his Swiss Super League debut at 7 February 2015 against BSC Young Boys replacing Adrian Winter after 87 minutes in a 1–1 home draw.

On 8 June 2017, he signed for Serie A side Atalanta, reportedly on a four-year contract, arriving as a free agent after leaving Lucerne at the end of his contract.

On 25 July 2018, Haas joined Serie B club Palermo on a season-long loan deal.

On 12 August 2019, Haas joined Serie B club Frosinone on loan until 30 June 2020.

On 25 September 2020, he joined Serie B club Empoli on loan. If Empoli were to be promoted to Serie A at the end of the 2020–21 season, Empoli was obligated to purchase his rights. That condition was fulfilled as Empoli was promoted.

Career statistics

Club

References

1996 births
Living people
People from Sursee District
Association football midfielders
Swiss men's footballers
Switzerland youth international footballers
Swiss expatriate footballers
FC Luzern players
Atalanta B.C. players
Palermo F.C. players
Frosinone Calcio players
Empoli F.C. players
Swiss Super League players
Serie A players
Serie B players
Expatriate footballers in Italy
Swiss expatriate sportspeople in Italy
Sportspeople from the canton of Lucerne